Thomas L. Angell (1837-1923) was an American Free Will Baptist pastor, academic, leader of the Lapham Institute, and early professor at Bates College in Maine.

Thomas L. Angell was born in 1837 in Greenville, Rhode Island to Pardon and Mary Ann Angell who were both descendants of Thomas Angell, a Baptist, who was one of the first settlers of Rhode Island. Angell attended the common school in Greenville and the Smithville Seminary and then Thetford Academy, Vermont and Wilbraham Academy where he prepared to attend Brown University, enrolling in 1858. In 1862 during the Civil War, Angell graduated from Brown and enlisted in the Rhode Island militia as aide de camp for General Tourtellotte. Upon his graduation, Angell taught school briefly in Greenville before attending Hartford Seminary. In 1864 started teaching at the Lapham Institute in North Scituate, Rhode Island with Benjamin F. Hayes, and eventually he succeeded Hayes as principal, working at the school for four years. In 1869, he followed Hayes to Bates College succeeding him as Professor of French and German (Modern Languages), and Angell remained at Bates until 1902. Angell also served as a Free Will Baptist pastor.

Angell was married Emily Brown until her death in 1902 and had one daughter, Mary Frances Lincoln, who graduated from Bates in  1890. Angell died in 1923 in Worcester, Massachusetts. Angel was a party in a Rhode Island Supreme Court case of Angell v. Angell, 28 RI 592 (1908), which addressed his father's estate. Several of Angell's early diaries and other letters from his time in Rhode Island and Maine are now held in the Bates College Special Collections Library.

References

External links
Angell's Papers at Bates College Archives

Bates College faculty
Brown University alumni
Free Will Baptists
Wilbraham & Monson Academy alumni
Hartford Seminary alumni
Thetford Academy, Vermont alumni